Health ecology (also known as eco-health) is an emerging field that studies the impact of ecosystems on human health. It examines alterations in the biological, physical, social, and economic environment to understand how these changes impact human mental and physical health. 

Common examples of such effects include an increase in asthma rates due to air pollution, PCB contamination of game fish in the Great Lakes of the United States, and habitat fragmentation as the main factor of the increased rate of Lyme disease in human populations.

Health ecology is specifically a multidisciplinary approach which seeks to understand all the factors which influence an individual's physiological, social, and emotional wellbeing.

History

Ecosystem approaches to health emerged as a defined field of inquiry and application in the 1990s, primarily through global research supported by the International Development Research Centre (IDRC) in Ottawa, Canada (Lebel, 2003). However, this was a resurrection of an approach to health and ecology that can be traced back, in Western societies, to Hippocrates and even earlier eras in Eastern societies. The approach was prominent among many scientists in the 18th and 19th centuries but fell out of common practice in the twentieth century when technical professionalism and expertise were assumed to be sufficient to deal with health and disease. In this relatively brief era, evaluation of the adverse human health impacts of environmental change (both the natural and artificial environment) was allotted to the fields of medicine and environmental health. As championed by scholars and practitioners such as Calvin Schwabe, one medicine was primarily considered a marginal activity.

Integrated approaches to Health and ecology re-emerged in the 1990s and included One Health conservation medicine, ecological resilience, ecological integrity, health communities, and a variety of other approaches. These new movements were able to draw on a tradition that stretches from Hippocrates to Rudolf Virchow and Louis Pasteur, who did not recognize the boundaries between human and animal medicine; environmental and social change to William Osler, who was a member of both the McGill medical faculty and the Montreal Veterinary College, also to Calvin Schwabe, whose 1984 book, Veterinary Medicine and Human Health, is a classic in the field; and lastly to James Steele, who founded the first veterinary public health unit in the United States.

Eco-health approaches, as currently practiced, are participatory, systems-based approaches to understanding and promoting Health and well-being in the context of social and ecological interactions. Differentiating these approaches from earlier integrative attempts is a firm grounding in complexity theories and post-normal science (Waltner-Toews, 2004; Waltner-Toews et al., 2008). While various organizations promote integrative approaches, such as One Health, the worldwide primary funding. After a decade of international conferences in North America and Australia under the more contentious umbrella of "ecosystem health", the first "ecosystem approach to human health" (eco health) forum was held in Montreal in 2003, followed by conferences and forums in Wisconsin, U.S., and Mérida, Mexico, all with major support from IDRC. Since then the International Association for Ecology and Health, and the journal Eco Health have established the field as a legitimate scholarly and development activity.

Definition
Eco-health studies differ from traditional, single-discipline studies. A formal epidemiological study may show increasing rates of malaria in a region but does not address the reasons for the increasing rate. An environmental health study may recommend the spraying of a pesticide in specific amounts in certain areas to reduce spread. An economic analysis may calculate the cost and effectiveness per dollar spent on such a program. An eco-health study uses a different approach. It brings the multiple specialist disciplines together with members of the affected community before the study begins. Through pre-study meetings, the group shares knowledge and adopts a common language. These pre-study meetings often lead to creative and novel approaches and can lead to a more "socially robust" solution. Eco-health practitioners term this synergy transdisciplinary and differentiate it from multidisciplinary studies. Eco-health studies also value the participation of all active groups, including decision-makers. They believe issues of equity (between gender, socioeconomic classes, age, and even species) are essential to understand the problem to be studied thoroughly. Jean Lebel (2003) phrased transdisciplinary, participation, and equity as the three pillars of Eco Health (Lebel, 2003). The IDRC now speaks of six principles instead of three pillars, namely transdisciplinary, participation, gender and social equity, system-thinking, sustainability, and research-to-action (Charron, 2011)

Examples 
A practical example of health ecology is the management of malaria in Mexico. A multidisciplinary approach ended the use of DDT harm while reducing malaria cases. This study reveals the nature of the complex interactions of the problem and the extent to which a successful solution must cross research disciplines. The solution involved creative thinking on the part of many individuals and produced a win-win situation for researchers, businesses, and, most importantly, the community. Although many of the dramatic effects of ecosystem change and much of the research are focused on developing countries, the ecosystem of the artificial environment in urban areas of the developed world is also a significant determinant of human Health. Obesity, diabetes, asthma, and heart disease are all directly related to how humans interact with the local urban ecosystem in which they live. In addition, urban design and planning determine car use, food choices available, air pollution levels, and the safety and walkability of the neighborhoods in which people live.

References

Further reading

External links

Conferences 
International Forum on Ecosystem Approaches to Human Health
Eco Health ONE Conference, October 2006
Conference on Health and Biodiversity 2005

Journals 
Conservation Biology
Eco Health
Ecosystem Health (March 1995-December 2001)
Global Change & Human Health (March 2000-March 2002)
Frontiers in Ecology and the Environment
Journal of Ecology of Health & Environment

Organizations 
Eco Health
Eco Health Network
International Association for Ecology and Health
Center for Sustainability and the Global Environment (SAGE) The University of Wisconsin–Madison, USA
Harvard Medical School Center for Health and the Global Environment, USA
Consortium for Conservation Medicine (CCM)
Consortium for Health and Ecology, Edith Cowan University, Australia
Ecosystem Health Program at the University of Western Ontario, Canada
Johns Hopkins Bloomberg School of Public Health, USA
Network for Ecosystem Sustainability and Health
Wilderness Medical Society Environmental Committee
The COHAB Initiative "Cooperation on Health and Biodiversity"
Millennium Ecosystem Assessment — A UN-led global project to assess the impacts of ecosystem change on human well-being; completed in 2005

Environmental health
Ecology
International sustainable development